The College of Health Sciences General Ahmad Yani Yogyakarta or Stikes Jenderal Ahmad Yani is a private university located in the Sleman Regency province Special Region of Yogyakarta, Indonesia. It is an Education Institute under the auspices of the Kartika Eka Paksi Foundation.

History
The college was established in Yogyakarta on June 15, 2006, by decree of the Minister of National Education No: 084 / DE / O / 2006, June 15, 2006, and Permissions Implementation of the Ministry of Health of Indonesia number: HK-03-241-02054. It includes facilities such as an international standard laboratory, a laboratory for medical simulation for midwifery and health community, a laboratory library, a consultation room for students, lecturers, and student parents, and a hotspot area.

Departments
The college offers the following courses of study:

 Midwifery
 Nursing
 Medical records
 Professional nursing
 Pharmaceutical or Pharmacy
 Blood bank technology

Facilities
The campus has five floors built in an integrated manner, on a total floor space of 12,000 m2, and supporting facilities, teaching and learning activities.

Laboratory of international standard consist of:

 Nursing laboratory
 Lab. Basic nursing
 Lab. Emergency
 Lab. Medical Surgery
 Lab. Child nursing
 Lab. Maternity nursing
 Lab. Community nursing
 Lab. Psychiatric nursing
 Lab. Geriatric nursing
 Midwifery laboratory
 Lab. Family planning
 Lab. Pregnancy test
 Lab. Labor
 Lab. Childbed
 Lab. Newborn baby
 Lab. Biomedicine
 Lab. Medical records
 Lab. Skill Medical Record
 Lab. Coding  
 Laboratory Support
 Lab. Computer
 Lab. Language
 Lab. Computer Based Test
 Hot Spot (Wifi)
Sports include table tennis, futsal, badminton, volleyball, basketball.
Art: Band, choir and dance.
Student dormitory

International partnership
Stikes Ahmad Yani Yogyakarta cooperates with various public and private national and international institutions. These include

  Takasaki University of Health and Welfare
  Khon Kaen University
  University of Tasmania

See also

 List of universities in Indonesia
 Education in Indonesia

References

External links 
  official website

Colleges in Indonesia
Universities in Indonesia
Educational institutions established in 2006
2006 establishments in Indonesia